Michele Coppino (1 April 1822 – 25 April 1901) was an Italian professor and politician.

Biography
Coppino was born to a poor family in Alba, Piedmont, where he later died. He was professor of Italian literature at the University of Turin and rector of the same from 1868 to 1870, when he moved to Rome (which had been declared capital of the Kingdom of Italy) to follow his political roles.

Coppino participated to the elections for the Chamber of Deputies of the Kingdom of Sardinia for the first time in 1857, but was defeated at the ballot. He was elected in 1860 and re-elected to the first legislature of the Italian Chamber of Deputies one year later. He was subsequently a member of the Italian Parliament for some 40 years, interrupted, and twice President of the Chamber (both times succeeding Domenico Farini).

Coppino was Minister of Education in the two first Depretis cabinets (1876-1878). He introduced the so-called Legge Coppino ("Coppino Law"), which made elementary schools mandatory and free of charge, with, in particular, no religious teaching. He was again Minister of Education under Depretis and Crispi between 1884 and 1888. Laws issued during his tenure include one for economical support for teachers, reorganization of kindergartens and of classic instructions.

Sources
Page at Dizionario Biografico degli Italiani by Enciclopedia Italiana, biography by G. Talamo

1822 births
1901 deaths
People from the Province of Alessandria
People from the Kingdom of Sardinia
Historical Left politicians
Education ministers of Italy
Presidents of the Chamber of Deputies (Italy)
Deputies of Legislature VIII of the Kingdom of Italy
Deputies of Legislature IX of the Kingdom of Italy
Deputies of Legislature X of the Kingdom of Italy
Deputies of Legislature XI of the Kingdom of Italy
Deputies of Legislature XII of the Kingdom of Italy
Deputies of Legislature XIII of the Kingdom of Italy
Deputies of Legislature XIV of the Kingdom of Italy
Deputies of Legislature XV of the Kingdom of Italy
Deputies of Legislature XVI of the Kingdom of Italy
Deputies of Legislature XVII of the Kingdom of Italy
Deputies of Legislature XVIII of the Kingdom of Italy
Deputies of Legislature XIX of the Kingdom of Italy
Deputies of Legislature XX of the Kingdom of Italy
Deputies of Legislature XXI of the Kingdom of Italy
Politicians of Piedmont